Arie L. Kopelman (born September 23, 1938) is an American businessman and philanthropist. He served as the President and COO of Chanel from 1986 until 2004, when he retired and was succeeded by former Banana Republic President Maureen Chiquet. Kopelman remains at Chanel as Vice Chairman of the Board.

Life and career 
Kopelman was born in Brookline, Massachusetts to Jewish parents, Frank and Ruth Kopelman. Frank Kopelman, a Harvard Law School graduate, practiced law and was a professor at Boston University. When he was  appointed to a judgeship in Boston, he was the youngest judge appointed in the state's history. Kopelman has a twin brother, David Kopelman, who followed in the footsteps of their father, attended Harvard for his undergraduate and law degrees, and went on to become a judge.

After attending The Boston Latin School and the Williston Northampton School, Kopelman completed his undergraduate at Johns Hopkins University and received an MBA from Columbia Business School. His first job after business school was working in the training program at Procter & Gamble, at their headquarters in Cincinnati, Ohio. After three years at the company, he became an account executive at the advertising firm Doyle Dane Bernbach (also called DDB Worldwide), where over the next twenty years he ascended the ranks to become Vice Chairman and then the General Manager. During his tenure at DDB Worldwide, Kopelman worked with clients including JB Liquors, Heinz Ketchup, and Chanel, which was one of his largest accounts.

In 1985 the owners of Chanel, Alain Wertheimer and Gérard Wertheimer, hired Kopelman as Chanel Inc.’s president and chief operating officer at their headquarters in New York City. At that point, Kopelman already had a 14-year-long working relationship with Chanel through DDB, where he had crafted advertising campaigns for the brand. Over the next 19 years at Chanel, Kopelman grew the brand to expand its core retail, fragrance, cosmetics, skin care, eyewear, and accessories businesses, transforming Chanel into a company earning multi-billion dollar revenues. At the outset of Kopelman’s career with Chanel, the brand had two standalone boutiques and its annual revenue was reported at $357 million. By the time of his retirement, there were 17 brick-and-mortar boutiques just in the United States and in 2014, Chanel reported annual sales in the area of $7 billion.

During his tenure as president, the company released the fragrances Coco, Coco Mademoiselle, Chance, Allure, Allure for Men, Cristalle, Egoiste, and Egoiste Platinum. Coco Mademoiselle is the world’s best-selling fragrance. Kopelman was in charge of brand strategy for the company’s iconic fragrance, Chanel No. 5. As such, he put together the fragrance’s five-year multi-platform endorsement deal with Nicole Kidman, as the face of the perfume, for which the director Baz Luhrmann created television advertisements.

Philanthropy and awards 
Kopelman is a member of several civic and charitable organizations in New York and the United States.

In January 1989, Kopelman was appointed by President Ronald Reagan to the United States Holocaust Memorial Council.

Kopelman was the recipient of the Fragrance Foundation (FiFi) Hall of Fame Award in 2005, and has been awarded three CFDA awards. In 2000, he was awarded the "Living Landmark" award by the New York Landmarks Conservancy.

From 1994 through 2017, Kopelman held the position of chairman of the Winter Antiques Show in New York City. He is credited with turning the show around by adding new leadership and infrastructure, and bringing new dealers into the fold.

Additionally, Kopelman has served on the Board of Overseers for Columbia Business School, as well as on the board of the St. Bernard's School for Boys in New York, the Municipal Arts Society, and East Side Settlement House. He was the president of the board of the Nantucket Historical Association. He is a founding board member of the Upper East Side Historic District, the president of admissions of the Century Country Club, served on the board of directors of the Heinz Awards, and on the board of The New York City School of American Ballet. Kopelman's wife attended the school as a child, and there is now a studio there named after Kopelman.

Personal life 
Kopelman is married to Corinne "Coco" Franco. Coco is from a Sephardic Jewish family. Her father was a business man of Greek descent, and her mother was French. The couple have two children, New York Times bestselling author, actress, and creator of the show Odd Mom Out, Jill Kargman (married to American businessman Harry Kargman), and Will Kopelman, who is a private art advisor and former husband of actress Drew Barrymore.  Kopelman and Franco have five grandchildren. They reside on the Upper East Side of Manhattan in New York City and additionally have a home in Nantucket.

References

Living people
1938 births
People from Boston
People from the Upper East Side
Johns Hopkins University alumni
Columbia Business School alumni
American businesspeople
Jewish American philanthropists
Philanthropists from New York (state)
21st-century American Jews